Dating Around is an American reality dating streaming television series on Netflix. The six-episode first season premiered on February 14, 2019. It is the "first original dating series" that Netflix has produced.

Each episode of the series follows one person going on five blind dates, with dates including people of various races and sexual orientations.

On February 6, 2020, the series was renewed for a second season, which premiered on June 12, 2020.

Episodes

Season 1 (2019)

Season 2 (2020)

Versions 
 Franchise with a currently airing season
 Franchise with an upcoming season
 Franchise with an unknown status
 Franchise awaiting confirmation
 Franchise that has ceased to air

References

External links

2010s American LGBT-related television series
2010s LGBT-related reality television series
2019 American television series debuts
2020 American television series endings
2020s American LGBT-related television series
2020s LGBT-related reality television series
American LGBT-related reality television series
American dating and relationship reality television series
English-language Netflix original programming
Television series by Eureka